Geobiology is a peer-reviewed scientific journal of geobiology published by Wiley-Blackwell. It was established in 2003 as both a print and online journal, with five issues per year. In 2011, the journal became online-only, and increased publication to six times per year. The editor-in-chief is Kurt Konhauser (University of Alberta).

Abstracting and indexing
The journal is indexed and abstracted in::

According to the Journal Citation Reports, the journal has a 2011 impact factor of 4.111, ranking it 6th out of 170 journals in the category "Geosciences, Multidisciplinary", 11th out of 84 journals in the category "Biology", and 19th out of 205 journals in the category "Environmental Sciences".

References

External links 
 Geobiology website

Geology journals
Biology journals
English-language journals
Publications established in 2003
Bimonthly journals
Wiley-Blackwell academic journals
Geobiology